Major General Sir Reginald Arthur James Talbot,  (11 July 1841 – 15 January 1929) was a British Army officer, Member of Parliament, and Governor of Victoria in Australia.

Early life
Talbot was born in London, the third son of Henry, Viscount Ingestre (later 3rd Earl Talbot and then 18th Earl of Shrewsbury) and Lady Sarah Elizabeth, née Beresford, daughter of the 2nd Marquess of Waterford. After attending Harrow School, he joined the British Army and became a sub-lieutenant in the 1st Regiment of Life Guards in 1859.

Political and military career
From 1869 to 1874, Talbot represented Stafford in the British House of Commons for the Conservative Party. On 8 May 1877, he married Margaret Jane Stuart-Wortley, granddaughter of the 1st Baron Wharncliffe.

He returned to active service in the army, fighting in the Anglo-Zulu War, Egypt and taking part in the unsuccessful Nile Expedition to relieve General Charles George Gordon in Khartoum. Talbot was appointed a Companion of the Order of the Bath in 1885. He became General Officer Commanding the British Troops in Egypt in 1899, serving as such until 1903.

He was promoted to Knight Commander of the Order of the Bath in the 1902 Coronation Honours list, and invested in person by the Duke of Connaught on 7 December 1902, when the Prince visited Egypt en route to India.

Governor of Victoria
He was sworn in as Governor of Victoria on 25 April 1904. His tenure was marked by Talbot's determination to achieve visible improvement, and his reports to Britain favourably compared Victoria's economic and educational statistics to those of 1903.

Talbot died in London on 15 January 1929.

Ancestry

References

External links

|-

|-

1841 births
1929 deaths
Military personnel from London
People educated at Harrow School
3rd Dragoon Guards officers
British Army generals
British Life Guards officers
British Army personnel of the Anglo-Zulu War
British Army personnel of the Anglo-Egyptian War
British Army personnel of the Mahdist War
Conservative Party (UK) MPs for English constituencies
Governors of Victoria (Australia)
Knights Commander of the Order of the Bath
UK MPs 1868–1874
Younger sons of earls
Reginald
Members of the Parliament of the United Kingdom for Stafford